The 2007 Omloop van Borsele was the 6th running of the Omloop van Borsele, a single-day women's cycling race. It was rated by the UCI as a 1.2 category race.

Marianne Vos won the 2007 Omloop van Borsele in a sprint of Regina Bruins. Ellen van Dijk finished third by winning the side by side sprint of Roxane Knetemann at 1' 18" of Vos.

Results

Sources

See also
2007 in women's road cycling

References

External links

Omloop van Borsele
Omloop
Omloop